Manipuri cuisine refers to the cuisine of Manipur, a state of northeastern India. Daily meals are based on rice, with a few side dishes of vegetables, fish and meat. All piquant side dishes are accompanied by a choice of fresh herbs, collectively called . The base and essence of Meitei cuisine is the fermented fish called . Several dishes of meat, mostly chicken and pork, are cooked with unique recipes. As a result of religious taboos, however, the Meitei Pangals do not cook the latter.

A side of steamed or boiled vegetables with a hint of sugar are also quite common as palate cleansers in most meals. The aromatics of most dishes start with frying bay leaf, chives, onion, garlic, and ginger in mustard oil. The rest of the vegetables follow after that. While fish is an essential part of the diet, due to increasing prices, fish curry is prepared only occasionally, or during feasts. The Meiteis and the Pangals live in the valley of Manipur where freshwater fish from lakes and rivers and ponds had been plentiful until recent times. While part of the cuisine has some influences from the cuisines of Southeast Asia, East Asia, Central Asia, Siberia, Micronesia, Polynesia, the Arctic as well as from Assam and West Bengal, the essence remains distinct from any other.

Basic diet 
The staple diet of Manipur consists of rice, fish, large varieties of leafy vegetables (of both aquatic and terrestrial). Manipuris typically raise vegetables in a kitchen garden and rear fishes in small ponds around their house. Since the vegetables are either grown at home or obtained from local market, the cuisines are very seasonal, each season having its own special vegetables and preparations. The taste is very different from other Indian cuisines because of the use of various aromatic herbs and roots that are peculiar to the region.

Aromatic herbs and roots used by the Manipuris 
 Nungshi hidak (Mint)
 Maroi napaakpi (Hooker chives)
 Yenam (maroi nakuppi) (Chinese chives)
 Awaa phadigom (Mexican coriander)
 Mayang-ton (Lemon basil)
 Toning-khok (chameleon plant)
 Khanghuman / Kanghu-maan (Meriandra dianthera, formerly Meriandra bengalensis)
 Mukthrubi (Zanthoxylum armatum / Sichuan peppercorn)
 Phakpai (Vietnamese coriander)
 Chantruk (pepper cress)
 Yaipan (Curcuma angustifolia)
 Kang-hu mapaan
 Takhel-manao
 Leibakmaroom
 Uyen (similar to shiitake mushroom)
 Uchi-na (jelly ear)
 Chengum (mushroom)
 Charu-yen 
 Kanglayen (split gill mushroom), 
 Ushoi (bamboo shoots)

There are also ingredients in the cuisine that require an acquired taste, such as Hawaijaar (fermented soya bean, somewhat similar to the Japanese Natto), Soibum (fermented bamboo shoot), Ngaa-ri (fermented fish), and Hentak (fermented fish powder and herbs).

Meats and seafood used by the Manipuris 
 Hameng (mutton)
 Khajing (shrimp)
 Nga (fish)
 Nganu (duck)
 Oak (pork)
 San (beef)
 Tharoi (snail)
 Yen (chicken)

Dishes 

Eromba: a chutney that have vegetables boiled or steamed with a lot of red chillies or umorok (king chilli) with ngari (fermented fish), smoked or roasted fish and mashed together. "U-morok" – literally ‘tree chilli’ u = tree; morok = chilli. It is garnished with herbs like maroi ( maroi nakuppi, phakpai, mayang-ton, toning-khok, kaanghumaan, lomba, tilhou, chaantruk, coriander leaves and many more).

Singju: a piquant salad which is prepared with an assortment of raw vegetables, and can have varying combinations depending on preference or season. The vegetables are chopped into very thin juliennes, while the accompanying herbs and leaves are coarsely chopped or shredded. Some of the usual main ingredients are cabbage, lotus stem,  (banana flower),  (a kind of scented herb),  (another herb), yongchaak (tree beans/stink beans/ Parkia speciosa). The accompanying herbs and leaves include sweet pea shoots, "toningkhok" (Houtuniya cordata) leaves and roots,  "heibi mana", coriander leaves etc. Most singju items are seasonal, making every season's singju a much loved treat. Singju can be seasoned with a chilli paste flavored with  roasted  (fermented fish), or with roasted "thoiding" seeds (Perilla frutescens) powder and roasted chick pea powder/roasted besan, plus roasted red chilli powder. Thoiding seeds are rich in healthy fats and vitamins, and when they are roasted they give a nutty flavor that is distinctive to a Singju. Other additional ingredients include boiled beans and peas, and also savory crispies, though these are optional. 

It is soupy in consistency and is eaten with rice.

Morok metpa: a coarse paste prepared with green or dry red chilies mixed with chopped onions, coriander leaves and other local herbs for garnishing. The chilies are steamed or roasted with ngari or simply crushed and then mashed with salt and ngari; fried fish pieces can also be added to it. This is something which accompanies both the meals as a routine side dish.

Kang-ngou or kaang-hou: various vegetables stir fried with traditional spices.

Nganam: fish and  baked on a pan.

Paaknam: a pancake prepared with a mixture of pea flour, and  wrapped in turmeric and banana leaves and either baked in a pan or steamed first and then roasted it for sometime.

Nga thongba: a fish curry. 

Ooti: a typical vegetarian dish. 

Pakoura thongba: a fritter curry.

Chagem pomba: a curry made with fermented soya, mustard leaves, roasted or smoked fish and other herbs.

Keli chana: a spicy chickpea snack 

Sana thongba: a curry prepared with paneer. 

Yen thongba: a chicken curry.

Nganu thongba: a duck curry. 

Oak thongba: a pork curry.

San thongba: a beef curry. 

Hameng thongba: a mutton curry.

Tharoi thongba: a snail curry.

Pan hawaijar thongba: a taro and fermented soybean curry.

Soibum thongba: a bamboo shoot curry.

A-nganba or champhut: steamed vegetables, such as pumpkin, peas, carrots, French beans, etc.

Chahao kheer: A black rice pudding.

Kabok: A puffed rice snack.

Kangshubi: A grounded seed snack.

References 

 
Cuisine
Northeast Indian cuisine
Indian cuisine by state or union territory